An all-time medal table for all African Games from 1965 to 2019 is tabulated below.

All-time medal table
50 nations have won at least a single medal in the African Games, from 54 National Olympic Committees participating throughout the history of the Games. 42 nations have won at least one gold medal.

NOCs without medals
 
 
 
 South Sudan

See also
All-time Asian Games medal table
All-time European Games medal table
All-time Pan American Games medal table

References

External links
 Medal winners in various events
 African games all time medal table